Rose Graham (25 September 1879–3 February 1974) was a New Zealand homemaker and hotel-keeper. She was born in Gillespies Beach, West Coast, New Zealand on 25 September 1879. In 1911, her husband Jim Graham and his brother, Alec, bought a six-room hotel at Franz Josef, where she worked as hostess and partner until the hotel, by then expanded to cater for 120, sold to the government in 1947.

References

1879 births
1974 deaths
New Zealand women in business
New Zealand businesspeople
New Zealand hoteliers
People from the West Coast, New Zealand